Mark Walters (born 15 February 1976 in Milfort) is a Canadian former cyclist.

Major results

1998
 1st  National Road Race Championships
 1st Stage 5 Tour de Beauce
1999
 1st Tour de Okinawa
 2nd Overall Tour de Toona
1st Stage 5
 3rd National Road Race Championships
2001
 1st  National Road Race Championships
 3rd Omloop van het Houtland
2002
 1st Philadelphia International Championship
2003
 2nd Overall Tour de Toona
1st Stage 6
 2nd National Road Race Championships
2004
 3rd Overall Fitchburg Longsjo Classic
1st Stage 3
2007
 1st Stage 1 Tour de Beauce

References

1976 births
Living people
Canadian male cyclists